The 300 Spartans is a 1962 CinemaScope epic film depicting the Battle of Thermopylae. Made with the cooperation of the Greek government, it was shot in the village of Perachora in the Peloponnese. The working title was Lion of Sparta. It stars Richard Egan as the Spartan king Leonidas,  Ralph Richardson as Themistocles of Athens and David Farrar as Persian king Xerxes, with Diane Baker as Ellas and Barry Coe as Phylon providing the love interest in the film. Greek warriors, led by 300 Spartans, fight against a Persian army of almost limitless size. Despite the odds, the Spartans will not flee or surrender, even if it means their deaths.

When it was released in 1962, critics saw the movie as a commentary on the Cold War,  referring to the independent Greek states as "the only stronghold of freedom remaining in the then known world", holding out against the Persian "slave empire".

Plot
King Xerxes of Persia leads a vast army of soldiers into Europe to defeat the small city-states of Greece, not only to fulfill the idea of "one world ruled by one master", but also to avenge the defeat of his father Darius at the Battle of Marathon ten years before. Accompanying him are Artemisia, the Queen of Halicarnassus, who beguiles Xerxes with her feminine charm, and Demaratus, an exiled king of Sparta, to whose warnings Xerxes pays little heed.

In Corinth, Themistocles of Athens wins the support of the Greek allies and convinces both the delegates and the Spartan representative, warrior king Leonidas I, to grant Sparta leadership of their forces. Outside the hall, Leonidas and Themistocles agree to fortify the narrow pass at Thermopylae until the rest of the army arrives. After this, Leonidas learns of the Persian advance and travels to Sparta to spread the news and rally the rest of the troops.

In Sparta, his fellow king Leotychidas is fighting a losing battle with the Ephors over the religious harvest festival of Carneia that is due to take place, with members of the council arguing that the army should wait until after the festival is over before it marches, while Leotychidas fears that by that time the Persians may have conquered Greece. Leonidas decides to march north immediately with his personal bodyguard of 300 men, who are exempt from the decisions of the Ephors and the Gerousia. They are subsequently reinforced by about 700 volunteer Thespians led by Demophilus and few other Greek allies.

After several days of fighting, Xerxes grows angry as his army is repeatedly routed by the Greeks, with the Spartans in the forefront. Leonidas receives word sent by his wife that, by decision of the Ephors, the remainder of the Spartan army, rather than joining him as he had expected, will only fortify the isthmus in the Peloponnese and will advance no further. The Greeks constantly beat back the Persians, and following the defeat of most of his "immortals" (personal bodyguard) in battle against the Spartans plus the death in battle of Xerxes' brother, Xerxes begins to consider withdrawing to Sardis until he can equip a larger force at a later date. 

He prepares to withdraw, as advised by Artemesia (who, having a Greek mother, may have her own agenda to dissuade the king from continuing the invasion). Xerxes, however, receives word from the treacherous and avaricious Ephialtes, who has been also spurned by Spartan maiden Ellas (who accompanied her Spartan soldier boyfriend Phyllon to the battlefield, where he wishes to prove his courage), of a secret old goat-track through the mountains that will enable Persian forces to attack the Greeks from the rear. Promising to richly reward the traitorous goatherd for his betrayal (as Ephialtes had expected), an emboldened Xerxes sends his army onward.

Once Leonidas realizes he will be surrounded, he sends away the Greek allies to alert the cities to the south. Being too few to hold the pass, the Spartans instead attack the Persian front, where Xerxes is nearby. Leonidas is killed in the melée. Meanwhile, the Thespians, who had refused to leave, are overwhelmed (offscreen) while defending the rear. Surrounded, the surviving Spartans refuse Xerxes's demand to give up Leonidas' body in exchange for safe passage. They are then all annihilated as the remaining Immortals rain down a barrage of arrows.

After this, narration states that the Battle of Salamis and the Battle of Plataea end the Persian invasion, but that the Greeks could not have been organized and victorious without the time bought by the 300 Spartans who defied the tyranny of Xerxes at Thermopylae. One of the final images of the film is the stone memorial bearing the epigram of Simonides of Ceos, which the narrator recites in honor of the slain 300 Spartan men's bravery :

"Oh stranger, tell the Spartans that we lie here obedient to their word."

Then ends with "...But it was more than a victory for Greece, it was a stirring example to free people throughout the world of what a few brave men can accomplish once they refuse to submit to tyranny!"

Main cast

 Richard Egan as King Leonidas of Sparta
 Ralph Richardson as Themistocles of Athens
 Diane Baker as Ellas, daughter of Pentheus
 Barry Coe as Phyllon, Spartan in love with Ellas
 David Farrar as King Xerxes of Persia
 Donald Houston as Hydarnes, leader of the Persian Immortals
 Anna Synodinou as Queen Gorgo of Sparta
 Kieron Moore as Ephialtes of Trachis, farm worker & Greek traitor
 John Crawford as Agathon, Spartan spy and soldier
 Robert Brown as Pentheus, Leonidas' second-in-command
 Laurence Naismith a Greek delegate
 Anne Wakefield as Artemisia, Queen of Halicarnassus
 Ivan Triesault as Demaratus, exiled former King of Sparta
 Charles Fernley Fawcett as Megistias, Spartan priest
 Michalis Nikolinakos as Myron, a Spartan
 Sandro Giglio as Xenathon, a Spartan Ephor
 Dimos Starenios  as Samos, a goatherd
 Anna Raftopoulou as Toris, Samos' wife
 Yorgos Moutsios as Demophilus, leader of the Thespians
 Nikos Papakonstantinou as Grellas, a Spartan in Xerxes' camp
 John G. Contes as Artovadus, Persian general
 Marietta Flemotomos as a Greek woman
 Kostas Baladimas as Mardonius, Persian general
 Zannino as Athenian citizen, Persian general

Production

The battle scenes were shot around Vouliagmenis Lagoon  (north of Loutraki and the Corinth Canal and west of the village of Perachora; northwest of Athens)--not to be confused with the much smaller Lake Vouliagmeni, due south of Athens. The northern Corinthian site doubled as Thermopylae and the surrounding areas as it had become impossible to shoot at the actual location in Thermopylae. The passage of 2,500 years of the receding coastline turned the strait where the actual battle was fought in 480 BCE into a broad coastal plain facing the Malian Gulf adding about 3.5 kilometers of dry land to the coastline by mid-20th century.

The Greek Defense Ministry agreed to make available to the producers up to 5,000 members of the Hellenic Army for a pre-negotiated fee. However, the film's budgetary constraints reduced the numbers drawn to only two battalions (approximately 1,100 men). The largest establishing scenes, of the Persian Army entering Greece, utilized many of these soldiers, together with a combined total of several hundred civilian extras, horses, cattle, ox carts, and chariots. For the wider establishing scenes of the battle, one battalion was retained to play both Greeks (about 450 soldier-extras) and Persians (some 650 soldiers). For closer compositions of the fighting and encampments, military extras were called (call-sheeted) by company-size or smaller units, in meeting the specific needs of the day's shooting schedule. Director of Photography Geoffrey Unsworth made good use of the tree groves, which lined the coastal plain aside the Limni Vouliagmeni lagoon, to cover for the obvious deficiency in the number of troops that would have been amassed on the Persian-side of the battle line.

Originally developed as an Italian sword-and-sandal project, the cooperation and blessing of the Greek government allowed the producers to both finance and complete the production on a budget of 500,000 GBP or approximately US$1,350,000, roughly twice for what most Italian peplum films were being made at the time. The 300 Spartans was the last film of Richard Egan's seven-year contract with 20th Century Fox. It was also the last film appearance of David Farrar, who then chose to retire from acting.

Release
In 1970, despite the attributed Cold War connotations, the film was dubbed in Russian and shown in the USSR. The film proved to be very popular, with 27.1 million total viewers.

Other adaptions
 Comic book -Dell Movie Classic: Lion of Sparta (January 1963)
 Novelisation - John Burke - The 300 Spartans Signet, New York; First Printing edition (1962)

Legacy
Frank Miller's 1998 graphic novel 300 depicts the same Battle of Thermopylae. The comic artist  saw The 300 Spartans as a boy and said "it changed the course of my creative life". In 2006, his book was adapted into a successful film of the same name directed by Zack Snyder.

See also
 List of American films of 1962
 List of historical drama films
 300, 2006 film
 300: Rise of an Empire, 2014 film

References

External links
 
 
 
 
 The 300 Spartans (1962) at DBCult Film Institute
 The 300 Spartans publicity photos  at 300spartanwarriors.com

1962 films
1960s historical films
American historical films
1960s English-language films
Classical war films
Battle of Thermopylae
American epic films
Epic films based on actual events
Films set in ancient Greece
Films shot in Greece
Films set in the 5th century BC
20th Century Fox films
Films directed by Rudolph Maté
Siege films
Films adapted into comics
1960s war adventure films
Historical epic films
Films scored by Manos Hatzidakis
Cultural depictions of Leonidas I
Cultural depictions of Xerxes I
CinemaScope films
Films shot in Athens
1960s American films